Dan + Shay is the third studio album by the American country music duo of the same name. It was released on June 22, 2018 via Warner Bros. Records Nashville. The album includes the singles "Tequila," "Speechless," and "All to Myself." It was nominated for the Country Music Association Award for Album of the Year and 
American Music Award for Favorite Country Album.

Background
The duo announced the track listing via social media in May 2018. In addition to lead single "Tequila", they announced that the album would contain a duet with Kelly Clarkson. Group member Dan Smyers told Taste of Country, "I feel like this is the first time we really nailed it telling our story, saying what we want to say and putting the songs out that sound like we want to sound and how we want to be perceived. It feels really special, the whole body of work."

Critical reception 

Cillea Houghton of Sounds Like Nashville reviewed the album with favor, stating that it "not only demonstrate how they've evolved musically on their self-titled record, but prove the purity that lives in their songwriting." It received 3.5 out of 5 stars from Rolling Stone, whose Jon Freeman wrote that the duo "maintain their low-key approach, delighting in simple, domestic pleasures and providing a reminder to pause and take a breath." Rating it 3 out of 5 stars, Stephen Thomas Erlewine of Allmusic was more mixed, saying that the album "may not be much more than aural wallpaper but that's all it's intended to be and, on that level, it's well executed: it's so slick and smooth, it doesn't make a single wave."

Commercial performance
Dan + Shay debuted at number six on US Billboard 200 chart and number one on US Top Country Albums, selling 44,000 album-equivalent units (including 24,000 in pure album sales) in its first week of release.  The album was certified gold on March 6, 2019 by the Recording Industry Association of America (RIAA), and then platinum on November 13, 2019 for combined sales and album-equivalent units of over 1,000,000 units in the United States. The album has sold 167,400 copies in the United States as of December 2019, and 1,280,000 units consumed in total as of February 2020.

Track listing

Personnel
Adapted from AllMusic

Dan + Shay
Shay Mooney – lead vocals, background vocals
Dan Smyers – acoustic guitar, electric guitar, keyboards, percussion, programming, synthesizer, background vocals

Additional Personnel
Jessica Blackwell – violin
Kelly Clarkson – duet vocals on "Keeping Score"
Matt Dragstrem – electric tenor guitar, piano, programming, slide guitar, synthesizer horn, background vocals
Chris Farrell – viola
Chase Foster – programming, synthesizer
Jesse Frasure – percussion, programming, synthesizer
Nick Gold – cello
David Hodges – percussion, programming
Charlie Judge – conductor, string arrangements, synthesizer
Jimin Lim – violin
Gordon Mote – keyboards, piano, string arrangements, synthesizer, Wurlitzer
Russ Pahl – pedal steel guitar
Jordan Reynolds – hammer dulcimer, keyboards, percussion, programming, synthesizer
Jimmy Robbins – programming
Jimmie Lee Sloas – bass guitar
Abby Smyers – background vocals
Bryan Sutton – banjo, dobro, acoustic guitar, hi-string acoustic guitar, mandolin
Ilya Toshinsky – banjo, bouzouki, acoustic guitar, mandolin
Keith Urban – electric guitar solo on "What Keeps You Up at Night"
Derek Wells – electric guitar
Nir Z. – drums, percussion, programming

Charts

Weekly charts

Year-end charts

Certifications

Notes

References

2018 albums
Dan + Shay albums
Warner Records albums
Albums produced by Scott Hendricks